Aniceto dos Reis Gonçalves Viana (1840–1914) was a Portuguese writer and orientalist, who led a committee that made reforms of Portuguese orthography to make it more phonetic.

Biography
Aniceto dos Reis Gonçalves Viana was born in Lisbon in 1840. His father, who was an actor, and his brother died of yellow fever in 1857. Viana had to concentrate on earning money to support his family.

He continued his studies, first studying Greek and then Sanskrit under Guilherme de Vasconcelos Abreu.

He led the commission that advised on how the spelling of Portuguese should be reformed. This change was successfully made, but created a schism with Brazil which continued to use the traditional spelling.

Selected works
1897; Selecta Easy English Readings
1897; Grammar English
1907; French Grammar

References

External links
 
 

1840 births
1914 deaths
Portuguese male writers
Portuguese orientalists
People from Lisbon
19th-century Portuguese writers
19th-century male writers